Radostná pod Kozákovem is a municipality in Semily District in the Liberec Region of the Czech Republic. It has about 400 inhabitants.

Administrative parts
The municipality is made up of villages of Kozákov, Lestkov and Volavec.

References

External links

 

Villages in Semily District